The Buffalo Open was a golf tournament on the Nike Tour. It was played in 1990 and then went on a hiatus until it returned in 1995 and 1996. It was played at Brierwood Country Club in Hamburg, New York.

In 1996 the winner earned $36,000.

Winners

Former Korn Ferry Tour events
Golf in New York (state)
Sports in Erie County, New York
Recurring sporting events established in 1990
Recurring sporting events disestablished in 1996
1990 establishments in New York (state)
1996 disestablishments in New York (state)